In physics, the trinification model is a Grand Unified Theory proposed by Alvaro De Rújula, Howard Georgi and Sheldon Glashow in 1984.

Details
It states that the gauge group is either

or

;

The L includes a hypothetical right-handed neutrino, which may account for observed neutrino masses (see neutrino oscillations), and a similar sterile "flavon."

This results in a spontaneous symmetry breaking from

The fermions branch (see restricted representation) as

,

,

,

and the gauge bosons as

,

,

.

Note that there are two Majorana neutrinos per generation (which is consistent with neutrino oscillations).

and

.

Note that calling representations things like  and (8,1,1) is purely a physicist's convention, not a mathematician's, where representations are either labelled by Young tableaux or Dynkin diagrams with numbers on their vertices, but it is standard among GUT theorists.

Since the homotopy group

,

this model predicts 't Hooft–Polyakov magnetic monopoles.

Trinification is a maximal subalgebra of E6, whose matter representation  has exactly the same representation and unifies the  fields. E6 adds 54 gauge bosons, 30 it shares with SO(10), the other 24 to complete its .

References

Grand Unified Theory